Brenda Margaret Duncan (born 23 October 1932) is a New Zealand former cricketer who played primarily as a right-arm pace bowler. She appeared in two Test matches for New Zealand in 1957. She played domestic cricket for Auckland.

References

External links
 
 

1932 births
Living people
Cricketers from Gisborne, New Zealand
New Zealand women cricketers
New Zealand women Test cricketers
Auckland Hearts cricketers